Mark Garaway (born 20 July 1973 in Swindon, Wiltshire) is a former English cricketer. Garaway was a right-handed batsman who played primarily as a Wicketkeeper.

Garaway represented Hampshire in three first-class and two List-A matches between 1996 and 1997. Garaway also played for the Marylebone Cricket Club in a single first-class match against a Pakistan A team.

In February 2006 and at the age of 32, Garaway was named as the new team analyst and assistant coach of England, ahead of the tour to India.

Garaway is currently the director of cricket for Cricket At Millfield School. Along with very talented assistant coaches Dan Helesfay, Matt Thompson and Jack Moore.

External links
Mark Garaway on Cricinfo
Mark Garaway on CricketArchive

1973 births
Living people
Sportspeople from Swindon
English cricketers
Hampshire cricketers
Marylebone Cricket Club cricketers
English cricket coaches